Epeorus albertae is a species of flatheaded mayfly in the family Heptageniidae. It is found in all of Canada, the western United States, and Alaska.

References

Mayflies
Articles created by Qbugbot
Insects described in 1924